Rampart is a 1990 video game released by Atari Games and Midway Games that combines the shoot 'em up, strategy, and puzzle genres. It debuted as an arcade game with trackball controls, and was ported to home systems. It had a limited US release in October 1990, and a wide release in early 1991. It was distributed in Japan by Namco.

Rampart is considered a precursor to the tower defense genre of the following decade.

Gameplay
The player controls and defends a territory consisting of a wall surrounding a set of castles and cannons. Gameplay alternates between two time-limited phases, combat and building. In the building phase, the player attempts to repair the damage from combat and expand their territory. In the combat phase, they attempt to damage the enemy with their cannons. In single-player games, the player fights against a fleet of attacking ships, in multi-player games, the players fight each other with rivers separating the sides.

The game opens with an automated building phase in which the computer builds a wall around one castle. The ownership of a castle grants the player control over a number of cannons, and after building the wall the game enters a phase in which the user places the cannons within their controlled territory.

When the building phase ends, combat begins. In single-player mode, the player is attacked by a number of ships that approach the player's territory while firing cannons at their walls. The player responds by firing their cannons at the moving ships; the relatively slow speed of the cannonballs requires the player to "lead" their targets. In multi-player mode, the players shoot at each other's walls. The goal of the attacker in both cases is to make holes in the walls. Combat ends when the user sinks a certain number of ships, or in two-player, after a set time.

When combat ends, the player loses control of any area that is no longer fully surrounded by their wall, along with any cannons in that area. A user-controlled building phase then begins. Shapes like those from Tetris appear and the player moves and rotates them with the goal of placing them so that they close gaps in the existing wall or extend the wall around additional castles.

When the tile placement phase time ends, any castle or cannon that is completely enclosed by a continual wall is added to the player's territory. Afterwards, the cycle repeats with cannon placement again. Each surrounded castle awards the player with one cannon during each arming phase (the home castle grants two) but only if there is space.

Because the damage caused during the combat phase is normally spread out, repairing it can be difficult. The blocks are generally larger than the gaps (although one-unit blocks do appear sometimes) and filling the gaps often requires a large block to fill a small gap. The leftover extra bits of the block become barriers to the placement of future blocks, making it increasingly difficult to fix the damage as the larger blocks may not fit into the block-free area.

The player loses when they fail to have at least one surrounded castle after the tile placement phase. In single-player games, there is a fixed set of six levels, and in two player modes if both players survive the one with the higher score is declared the winner. If the player defeats the opponent, the player can execute the commander, by walking the plank or beheading. Cannons can be destroyed, bonus squares give extra points when captured, and when there are no grunts or craters.

Ports 
Rampart has been ported to the SNES, Master System, Mega Drive/Genesis, Atari Lynx, MS-DOS, Macintosh, Commodore 64, Amiga, and Atari ST. Separate versions were made for Game Boy, Game Boy Color, Nintendo Entertainment System, and Famicom. The NES, SNES, and MS-DOS versions were all done by Bitmasters, and the NES version was planned for publication by Tengen (without a Nintendo license), but was switched to Jaleco (which was granted a Nintendo license), and the SNES and MS-DOS versions were published by Electronic Arts. Most of the home versions have updated features. The Japanese Famicom version, which was released by Konami, includes 7 training levels, 3 difficulty settings, and an extensive two-player mode. Many options can be chosen, such as the number of cannons to start with. In the SNES and MS-DOS versions, the cannons gained can also be converted into powerups.

The arcade version is part of the Midway Arcade Treasures compilation for the GameCube, PlayStation 2, Xbox, and PlayStation Portable, and of the Midway Arcade Origins compilation for the PlayStation 3 and Xbox 360. It is bundled in a dual pack with Gauntlet for the Game Boy Advance. A PlayStation 3 version with Internet multiplayer mode was released on the PlayStation Network on May 10, 2007.

Reception 
In Japan, Game Machine listed Rampart in the June 1, 1991 issue as the seventh most-successful table arcade unit of the month.

Julian Rignall of Computer and Video Games reviewed the arcade game, giving it a 93% score.

MegaTech gave the Mega Drive version 90% and a Hyper Game Award, saying that it was a "superb blend of different game styles". Console XS reviewed the Master System version, giving it an 81% score. Nintendo Power placed it the fourth best Game Boy Game of 1993.

Legacy
Rampart influenced the first tower defense games around a decade later. Gameplay similarities include defending a territory by erecting defensive structures, and making repairs between multiple rounds of attacks.

References

External links

Rampart at the Arcade History database

1990 video games
Amiga games
Arcade video games
Atari arcade games
Atari Lynx games
Atari ST games
Cancelled ZX Spectrum games
Commodore 64 games
Domark games
DOS games
Game Boy Color games
Game Boy games
Classic Mac OS games
Midway video games
Namco arcade games
Nintendo Entertainment System games
PlayStation Network games
Master System games
Sega Genesis games
Shooter video games
Super Nintendo Entertainment System games
Tengen (company) games
Trackball video games
Video games scored by Alex Rudis
Video games scored by Allister Brimble
Video games developed in the United States
Video games set in castles
Video games set in the Middle Ages